The 2003 FIVB Volleyball Boys' U19 World Championship was held in Suphanburi, Thailand from 5 to 13 July 2003.

Competing nations
The following national teams have qualified:

Venues
Chaopha Gymnasium (Suphanburi) – Pool C, D
Silpa-Archa Gymnasium (Suphanburi) – Pool A, B

Preliminary round

Pool A

|}

|}

Pool B

|}

|}

Pool C

|}

|}

Pool D

|}

|}

Play-off

Seeding group

|}

Elimination group

|}

Final round

Championship

|}

|}

|}

Classification 5th–8th

|}

|}

Final standing

Awards
Best Scorer:  Mohammad Soleimani
Best Spiker:  Roman Danilov
Best Blocker:  Danilo
Best Server:  Aleksey Ostapenko
Best Setter:  Ramaswami Kamraj
Best Digger:  Edgardo Hernández
Best Receiver:  Moslem Mohammadizadeh

External links
 Official Website

FIVB Volleyball Boys' U19 World Championship
World Youth Championship
V
V
Sport in Suphan Buri province